Ethan Allen Interiors Inc. is an American furniture chain with about 300 stores (called Design Centers) across the United States, Canada, Europe, the Middle East and Asia. It was founded in 1932 by two brothers-in-law, Nathan S. Ancell and Theodore Baumritter.

Operations
As of 2020, Ethan Allen has 304 design centers domestically and abroad, nine manufacturing facilities in the United States, Mexico, and Honduras, and 14 retail delivery centers located across the United States and Canada as of 2019, along with sales of $589.8 million. It is one of the largest furniture companies in the United States.

The company makes customized furniture domestically (Maiden, NC), such as upholstered furniture, sofas, and chairs, custom made in a selected fabric.

History
The company was started as a housewares manufacturer in 1932 by Theodore Baumritter and his brother-in-law Nathan S. Ancell. They bought a bankrupt furniture factory in Beecher Falls, Vermont, in 1936 and adopted the name "Ethan Allen" for its early-American furniture introduced in 1939, after the Vermont Revolutionary leader Ethan Allen.

In 1972, Ethan Allen moved its headquarters from New York City to Danbury, Connecticut. The Ethan Allen International Headquarters Complex includes the Ethan Allen Hotel, corporate headquarters offices, and an interior design center. The firm was sold in 1980 to Interco for $150 million, with Ancell remaining as an advisor. The company was sold again in 1989 to a management group headed by current chairman, president, and CEO Farooq Kathwari. In 1993, the company went public to help raise $156.9 million through the sale of common stock.

In 2004, Ethan Allen closed its two plants in Boonville, New York and Bridgewater, Virginia, laying off 250 each. 
 
In 2008, the company announced plans to close a dozen design centers. The decision was made to consolidate the design centers with others that were currently serving the same market area.

In 2009, the company laid off 238 workers from Beecher Falls, Vermont; 93 workers remained. 
In 2009, Ethan Allen closed the Eldred, PA manufacturing plant.

In 2021, during the 2021 cryptocurrency boom, the company's stock price increased as investors confused the company's stock with Ethereum, which shares the same ticker symbol.

Manufacturing plants

Current manufacturing plants
Orleans, Vermont
Silao, Guanajuato, Mexico
Passaic, New Jersey
Old Fort, North Carolina 
Maiden, North Carolina

Former manufacturing plants

References

External links

 Spotlight on Ethan Allen - Toronto

Companies listed on the New York Stock Exchange
Furniture retailers of the United States
Manufacturing companies established in 1932
Companies based in Danbury, Connecticut
Barton, Vermont
Retail companies established in 1932